Every Mother Counts may refer to:
Every Mother Counts, an advocacy and mobilization campaign founded by Christy Turlington
Every Mother Counts (album), a 2011 compilation album
Every Mother Counts 2012, a 2012 compilation album